Living Other Lives is a novel by the American writer Caroline Leavitt set in 1990s New York City and Pittsburgh, Pennsylvania.

It tells the story of Lilly Bloom, who after her fiancé's accidental death just before their marriage, drives his unruly daughter, Dinah, 15, from Manhattan to the Pittsburgh home of her deceased fiancé's mother.

References

1995 American novels
Novels set in Pittsburgh
Novels set in Manhattan
Warner Books books